Rui Pedro Silva Costa (born 20 February 1996) is a Portuguese professional footballer who plays for S.C. Farense as a forward.

Club career

Varzim
Born in Vila Nova de Famalicão, Braga District, Costa played youth football for three clubs, including local F.C. Famalicão from ages 9 to 17. He made his senior debut in February 2015, with Varzim SC's reserves.

Promoted to the latter's first team for the 2016–17 season in the Segunda Liga, Costa's first match in the competition took place on 6 August 2016, when he played 62 minutes in a 1–0 away loss against Gil Vicente FC. He went on to score 14 goals, helping his team to the ninth position and being voted Best Newcomer of the Year in that level.

Portimonense
Costa was loaned by Primeira Liga side Portimonense S.C. to Famalicão in August 2017. In October/November of that year, he netted three consecutive braces in the league in as many wins.

In January 2018, Costa had everything arranged to join FC Porto B. However, after it was discovered that he had been registered by Varzim five days prior to signing with Portimonense – thus representing three clubs in the same season – the move was declared void. He made his debut in the Portuguese top flight on 31 March, coming on as a 75th-minute substitute in a 4–3 home victory over Moreirense FC.

Porto and Deportivo
In July 2018, Costa was finally made a part of Porto B's setup. A year later, he moved abroad for the first time in his career after agreeing to a one-year loan deal with AD Alcorcón in the Spanish Segunda División. He continued in the country in September 2020, signing a two-year contract with Deportivo de La Coruña who had just been relegated from the same league; Porto remained entitled to 50% of any future transfer.

Santa Clara
Costa joined C.D. Santa Clara on a two-and-a-half-year deal on 1 February 2021. He scored his first top-tier goal on 5 March to equalise in a 2–1 loss at eventual champions Sporting CP, and netted two more in a 5–1 home defeat of C.D. Nacional on 11 April, as the Azorean club finished a best-ever sixth and qualified for the UEFA Europa Conference League.

On 12 August 2021, Costa scored the only goal as Santa Clara won away at NK Olimpija Ljubljana in the second leg of their European third qualifying round. The following 26 January, in the team's first-ever Taça da Liga semi-final, he was sent off for handball, conceding a penalty kick from which Pablo Sarabia scored in Sporting's 2–1 victory in Leiria.

Later career
Costa moved to second-tier S.C. Farense on 1 September 2022.

References

External links

Portuguese League profile 

1996 births
Living people
People from Vila Nova de Famalicão
Sportspeople from Braga District
Portuguese footballers
Association football forwards
Primeira Liga players
Liga Portugal 2 players
Campeonato de Portugal (league) players
F.C. Famalicão players
Varzim S.C. players
Portimonense S.C. players
FC Porto B players
C.D. Santa Clara players
S.C. Farense players
Segunda División players
Segunda División B players
AD Alcorcón footballers
Deportivo de La Coruña players
Portuguese expatriate footballers
Expatriate footballers in Spain
Portuguese expatriate sportspeople in Spain